XYZ is the debut studio album from Japanese idol group ExWhyZ. It was released on November 2, 2022, by EMI Records. The album was preceded by two singles, "Wanna Dance" and "Obsession". The album consists of eleven tracks. The album was re-released as XYZ (Hyper Edition) on March 1, 2023, including vocals from Midoriko and one additional track.

Track listing

Charts

References

2022 debut albums
Empire (Japanese band) albums
Japanese-language albums